Keith Darryl Kidd (born September 10, 1962) is a former American football wide receiver who played one season with the Minnesota Vikings of the National Football League (NFL). He was drafted by the Minnesota Vikings in the ninth round of the 1984 NFL Draft. He played college football at the University of Arkansas and attended Crossett High School in Crossett, Arkansas.

College career
Kidd played for the Arkansas Razorbacks from 1980 to 1983, recording 517 receiving yards and four touchdowns on 24 receptions.

Professional career
Kidd was selected by the Minnesota Vikings with the 235th pick in the 1984 NFL Draft. He was signed by the team on August 1, 1984. He was placed on injured reserve with a pulled hamstring on August 27, 1985. Kidd played in one game for the Vikings during the 1987 season.

References

External links
Just Sports Stats
College stats

Living people
1962 births
Players of American football from Arkansas
American football wide receivers
African-American players of American football
Arkansas Razorbacks football players
Minnesota Vikings players
People from Crossett, Arkansas
National Football League replacement players
21st-century African-American people
20th-century African-American sportspeople